Wangtan is a village in Jieji, Sihong County, in the northwest of Jiangsu province, China approximately  west of the city of Huai'an.

References 

 

Suqian
Villages in China